Adobe Lightroom (officially Adobe Photoshop Lightroom) is a piece of image organization and image manipulation software developed by Adobe Inc. as part of the Creative Cloud subscription family. It is supported on Windows, macOS, iOS, Android, and tvOS (Apple TV). Its primary uses include importing, saving, viewing, organizing, tagging, editing, and sharing large numbers of digital images. Lightroom's editing functions include white balance, presence, tone, tone curve, HSL, color grading, detail, lens corrections, and calibration manipulation, as well as transformation, spot removal, red eye correction, graduated filters, radial filters, and adjustment brushing. The name of the software is based on darkrooms used for processing light-sensitive photographic materials.

Overview 
Lightroom is a non-destructive editing software that keeps the original image separate from any in-program edits, saving the edited image as a new file. While Photoshop includes doctoring functions like adding, removing or altering the appearance of individual image items, rendering text or 3D objects on images, or modifying individual video frames, Lightroom is a library and development software. Lightroom can store and organize photos once imported into the platform database, and is currently compatible with TIFF, JPEG, PSD (Photoshop), PNG, CMYK (edited in RGB color space) and raw image formats.

Initially, Adobe Lightroom was only available on desktop operating systems. However, in 2017, it was expanded to support mobile operating systems with the release of Lightroom Mobile. Later in 2017, Adobe released a brand new variant of Lightroom called Lightroom CC to be more cohesive with their mobile software. The existing version of Lightroom was renamed Lightroom Classic CC, and Lightroom Mobile was renamed to Lightroom CC to have the same name as this new desktop version. While similar in some ways, all three Lightroom variations have significant differences in how they store images and interact with Adobe's cloud storage offering and in feature parity. Lightroom CC stores all uploaded photos and raw files on a cloud server, while Lightroom Classic CC stores files locally and has a more comprehensive set of features. Both CC platforms and Lightroom Mobile also allow users to create, upload, and export Lightroom presets, a batch copy of an image's in-program edits.

There is currently a large market for Lightroom presets as a tool for both mobile and digital photographers looking for an easy way to apply a stylized look to their images.

Lightroom Classic CC and Lightroom CC feature the following workflow steps:

Library 

 Similar in concept to the 'Organizer' in Adobe Photoshop Elements and other image organizers, this module allows users to browse the directory structure of their catalog, browse and create Collections, access Publish Services, import and export images, edit Keywords, organize images by their metadata, and flag, rate, tag, and color code images.

Develop 

 Supports non-destructive editing of images in batch form. This module is more for retouching and manipulations, such as enhancing and improving digital photographs by changing color balance, improving tone, sharpening, reducing noise, cropping, straightening, and converting to black-and-white. Lightroom cannot create or edit non-photographic images, such as drawings, symbols, line arts or diagrams or maps, or render text or 3D objects. It has very limited photo doctoring features, including spot removal, brush adjustments, radial and graduated filters, and red eye removal. Another often used feature in the Develop module is the ability to synchronize edits from one photo to a selection.
 Upon download, Lightroom provides users with several standard presets for color correction and effects, and supports sharing custom presets online. There is currently a large market for both desktop and mobile image manipulation packages. Photographers and creators with large followings on Instagram and Facebook sell Lightroom Presets to their audience, marketing to their ease and versatility after download. Presets are attached to .XMP and .LRTEMPLATE files that can be imported to Lightroom via the presets pane and include all adjustment settings from the originally doctored photo. Presets are around 4 Kilobytes in size and can range in price from free to upwards of $200.

Map 

 Added in Lightroom 4, this module facilitates geographically organizing photos based on embedded or manually added geolocation data (since end of 2018 this is no longer supported for up to Lightroom CC 2015.x / Lightroom 6.x).

Slideshow 

 This module creates slideshows from any number of photos, to which music or a background can be added.

Print 

 Allows users to print images and adjusts printing parameters such as layout and orientation.

Web 

 Allows website owners or editors to create simple or sophisticated HTML5 web galleries from their uploaded images. This module has several templates available to users that create layout suggestions. The design and HTML can be exported locally to the device or directly to a site's server.

History 
In 1999, veteran Photoshop developer Mark Hamburg began a new project, code-named Shadowland (a reference to the 1988 KD Lang music album of same name). Hamburg contacted Andrei Herasimchuk, former interface designer for the Adobe Creative Suite, to start the project. It was an intentional departure from many of Adobe's established conventions. Forty percent of Photoshop Lightroom is written in the scripting language Lua. In 2002, Hamburg left the Photoshop project and in fall of the same year he sent a first experimental software sample, name PixelToy, to his former teammate Jeff Schewe for review; in 2003, Hamburg presented Schewe a first version of Shadowland in a very early UI version.  After a few years of research by Hamburg, Herasimchuk, Sandy Alves (the former interface designer on the Photoshop team), and Grace Kim (a product researcher at Adobe), the Shadowland project accelerated around 2004. However, Herasimchuk chose to leave Adobe Systems at that time to start a Silicon Valley design company. Hamburg then chose Phil Clevenger, a former associate of Kai Krause, to design a new look for the application.

Photoshop Lightroom's developers work mostly in Minnesota, comprising the team that had already created the program Adobe ImageReady. Troy Gaul, Melissa Gaul, and the rest of their crew (reportedly known as the "Minnesota Phats"), with Hamburg, developed the architecture behind the application. George Jardine was the product manager.

Beta development 
On January 9, 2006, an early version of Photoshop Lightroom, formerly named only Lightroom, was released to the public as a Macintosh-only public beta, on the Adobe Labs website. This was the first Adobe product released to the general public for feedback during its development. This method was later used in developing Adobe Photoshop CS3.

On June 26, 2006, Adobe announced that it had acquired the technology of Pixmantec, developers of the Rawshooter image processing software.

Further beta releases followed. Notable releases included Beta 3 on July 18, 2006, which added support for Microsoft Windows systems. On September 25, 2006, Beta 4 was released, which saw the program merged into the Photoshop product range, followed by a minor update on October 19, which was released as Beta 4.1.

Version 1.0 
On January 29, 2007, Adobe announced that Lightroom would ship on February 19, 2007, list priced at $299 US, £199 UK.

Lightroom v1.x is not updated when an upgrade to v2 is installed; a new serial number is needed.

Version 2.0 
Adobe Photoshop Lightroom 2.0 Beta was advertised in official emails from Adobe in April 2008. New features included:
 Localized corrections: edit specific parts of an image
 Improved organization tools
 Multiple monitor support
 Flexible printing options
 64-bit support

The official release of Lightroom v2 was on July 29, 2008, along with the release of Adobe Camera Raw v4.5 and DNG Converter 4.5. Adobe Camera Raw allows importing the proprietary raw data images of various camera manufacturers.

Adobe added DNG Camera Profiling to both releases. This technology allows custom camera color profiles, or looks, to be created and saved by users. It also allows profiles matching the creative styles built into cameras to be replicated. At the same time as the Lightroom v2 release, Adobe [through Adobe Labs] released a full set of such Camera Profiles for Nikon and Canon models, along with basic Standard Profiles for all supported makes and models. This technology is open to all programs compliant with the DNG file format standard.

Version 3.0 

Adobe Photoshop Lightroom 3.0 beta was released on October 22, 2009.  New features included:

 New chroma noise reduction
 Improved sharpening tool
 New import pseudo module
 Watermarking
 Grain
 Publish services
 Custom package for print

On March 23, 2010, Adobe released a second beta, which added the following features:

 New luminance noise reduction
 Tethered shooting for selected Nikon and Canon cameras
 Basic video file support
 Point curve

Although not included in any beta release, version 3 also contains built-in lens correction and perspective control.

The final version was released on June 8, 2010 with no major new functions added. It had all the features included in the betas, added the lens corrections and perspective transformations, and a few more improvements and performance optimizations.

Version 4.0 
Adobe Photoshop Lightroom 4.0 was officially released on March 5, 2012 after being available in beta format since January 10, 2012. It dropped support for Windows XP. New features included:

 Highlight and shadow recovery to bring out detail in dark shadows and bright highlights
 Photo book creation with templates
 Location-based organization to find and group images by location, assign locations to images, and display data from GPS-enabled cameras
 white balance brush to refine and adjust white balance in specific areas of images
 Added local editing controls to adjust noise reduction and remove moiré in targeted areas
 Extended video support to organize,

Version 5.0 
Adobe Photoshop Lightroom 5.0 was officially released on June 9, 2013 after being available in beta format since April 15, 2013. The program needs Mac OS X 10.7 or later, or Windows 7 or 8. Some of the changes include:

 Radial gradient to highlight an elliptical area
 Advanced healing-cloning brush to brush the spot removal tool over an area
 Smart previews to allow working with offline images
 The ability to save custom layouts in the Book module
 Support of PNG files
 Support of video files in slideshows
 Various other updates, including automatic perspective correction and enhancements to smart collections

An update to Version 5, 5.4 allows syncing a collection to Lightroom Mobile App released for iPad on April 8, 2014.

Version 6.0 
Adobe Photoshop Lightroom CC 2015 (version 6.0) was officially released on April 21, 2015. The program needs OS X 10.8 or later, or Windows 7 or 8. It is the first release of Lightroom to only support 64-bit operating systems. New features include:

 HDR Merge
 Panorama Merge
 Performance improvements, GPU acceleration
 Facial recognition
 Advanced video slideshows
 Filter Brush

Lightroom 6.7 increased the minimum version of macOS required to OS X 10.10.

Apple TV
On July 26, 2016, Adobe launched Lightroom on Apple TV, a means of displaying photographs on a large screen using Apple's network appliance and entertainment device.

Development branches 
Adobe Photoshop Lightroom Classic CC (unofficially: version 7.0) was officially released on October 18, 2017. It is the first version of Lightroom that is not available with a perpetual license (one-time purchase price); instead, it must be licensed through a monthly subscription model, with the fee initially set at US$9.99/month. Once the user stops paying the monthly fee, the program will be limited to viewing existing catalogs, without the ability to apply further changes to images.

Adobe Lightroom CC is the new online cloud-based version of Adobe's Lightroom application and can be installed alongside Lightroom Classic CC. It is included in the same US$9.99/month photography plan, but has limited editing features in comparison to Lightroom Classic CC. It can be installed on desktops, laptops, iPad and mobile. Lightroom CC has the ability to sync developed photos easily between a laptop, iPad and mobile devices, which is the major difference between both applications. Its user interface is also more similar to that of Adobe's mobile version of the applications.

Adobe Lightroom Classic CC (version 8.0+)
 Version 8.0
HDR panoramas
Depth Map Masking
Support for the HEIC file format
Better tethered camera support
Support for Process Engine 5.0
New camera and lens support
Bug fixes
 Version 8.1
Ability to customize the develop panel order
"Snap to Grid" in the Book module
Ability to show partially compatible presets
Photo Merge improvements
New camera and lens support
Bug fixes
 Version 8.2
Enhance Details tool which extracts additional detail from raw files during initial processing
New camera and lens support
Bug fixes
 Version 8.2.1
Bug fixes
 Version 8.3
Flat-Field Correction tool to reduce shading or lens cast
New Texture slider
Ability to import photos from devices using the Files section
Improved performance of the Auto setting
New camera and lens support
Bug fixes
 Version 8.3.1
Bug fixes for issues exporting photos to a network drive
 Version 8.4
Advanced GPU improvements
Batch HDR and panorama merges
Book Auto-Create Cell feature
Export as PNG
Color labels for collections
Filmstrip index numbers
New camera and lens support
Bug fixes
 Version 8.4.1
Bug fixes

Version 9.0 
 Version 9.0
Updated system requirements on both Windows and macOS
Fill edges for panorama merge
New export presets
Additional filter options
Improved keyword performance
Removed photos shortcut
New camera and lens support
Bug fixes
 Version 9.1
New camera and lens support
Bug fixes
 Version 9.2
Custom preset defaults per camera upon import
PSB file support
Auto Sync button
Better multiple monitor support
Export dialog updates
GPU updates
Catalog migration from Photoshop Elements 2020
New camera and lens support
Bug fixes
 Version 9.2.1
New camera and lens support
Bug fixes
 Version 9.3
New icons
Local HSL adjustment
New presets for defaults
ISO adaptive presets
New tone curve user interface
Improved sync activity
Improved performance
HEVC video file format support
New user tutorials
New camera and lens support
Bug fixes

 Version 9.4
"Done" button in import dialog
New camera and lens support
Bug fixes

Version 10.0 
 Version 10.0
Updated system requirements
Improved split toning which gives control over midtones in addition to shadows and highlights (renamed tool to Color Grading)
Zoom enhancements
Major GPU performance improvements
Updated font
New camera and lens support
Bug fixes
 Version 10.1
Performance improvements
Bug fixes related to macOS Big Sur
New camera and lens support
Support for other Creative Cloud ecosystem updates
 Version 10.1.1
Bug fix for missing lens metadata which caused Creative Cloud sync to fail.
 Version 10.2
Performance improvements, bug fixes and new camera/lens support.
Improved macOS Big Sur compatibility.
The entire Lightroom Cloud ecosystem has also been updated.
 Version 10.3
Apple M1 Chip Compatibility
Super Resolution
Preset Changes
Scrolling by Page (Library Grid view)
Performance Improvements
New camera support
Tethering for new cameras
New lens correction support
Bug fixes
 Version 10.4
Duplicate Collection Sets (Classic only)
Nikon Tethered Live View support (Classic only)
New camera profiles and new supported lenses
Bug fixes

Version 11.0 
 Version 11.0
Masking
Metadata Panel
Performance Improvements
More New Presets
Filter by Specific Date
Adobe Stock plug-in update
Catalog Upgrade
New Camera-matching Profiles
New camera profiles and new supported lenses
Bug fixes
 Version 11.1
Auto Save to XMP
Android Camera
New camera support
New lens correction support
Bug fixes
 Version 11.2
Masking Update
Migration from Photoshop Elements 2022 is now supported
performance improvements
New camera support
New lens correction support
Lightroom Cloud ecosystem has also been updated
Bug fixes
 Version 11.3
Masking Update
Reset Preferences
Performance
New camera support
New lens correction support
Bug fixes
 
Bug fixed: Open Catalog causing substrate.dll issue and crashing (some Windows systems).
Bug fixed: Default Metadata shows Original and Cropped as same dimensions.
 Version 11.4
Batch Update Select Sky/Subject Masks
Invert Composite Mask
Preset Amount Slider
Export Using GPU
Automatic Preview Purging
Other Feature Improvements (New Presets, Masking, Masking, Crop tool, Info Overlays, New languages)
New tether support
New camera support
New lens correction support
Bug fixes
 Version 11.4.1
 It’s a quick bug fix release. The bugs fixed are:
Crash on quit with LrC 11.4 on Windows.
Crash on moving to next image with masking panel open.
Bug fixes

 Version 11.5
 Couple of small added features, as well as performance improvements, bug fixes and new camera/lens support. The entire Lightroom Cloud ecosystem has also been updated.

Version 12.0 
Version 12.0
Masking Updates
Healing Tool Updates
Other General additions / Improvements
Catalog Upgrade
New camera support
New lens profiles (Apple iPhone 14)
Some bug fixes
Version 12.0.1
Only bug fixes
Version 12.1
Masking Slider Updates
Automatically Show/Hide Masks Panel
Native Canon Tethering
Other General additions / Improvements
Tethering
New camera support
New lens profiles
Bug fixes
The entire Lightroom cloud-based ecosystem has also been updated.
Version 12.2
Some minor enhancements, but this is primarily a release for bug fixes
New camera/lens support and tethering for a new camera.
The entire Lightroom Cloud ecosystem has also been updated.

Adobe Lightroom CC (version 3.0+ on desktop; 5.0+ on mobile)
 Version 3.0 on desktop; 5.0 on mobile
Initial release
 Version 3.1 on desktop; 5.1 on mobile
Contribute photos to Lightroom shared albums
Directly import photos from a camera or SD card*
Export photos in format of your choice*
New camera profiles and supported lenses
Bug fixes
 Version 3.2 on desktop;  5.2 on mobile
Export photos as DNG**
Import presets and profiles from Google Drive*
New camera and lens support
New keyboard shortcuts**
 Version 3.2.1 on desktop; 5.2.1 on mobile
New camera and lens support
Bug fixes
 Version 3.3 on desktop; 5.3 on mobile
Share photos to Discover section
Local HSL adjustment
Create edit versions
Customize default settings for raw photos
Add text watermarks to photos**
Send photos to Photoshop for iPad*
New camera and lens support
Bug fixes
 Version 3.4 on desktop; 5.4 on mobile
New camera and lens support
Bug fixes
 Version 4.0 on desktop; 6.0 on mobile
Improved split toning which gives control over midtones in addition to shadows and highlights (renamed tool to Color Grading)
Support for graphical watermarks upon export
New "For you" tab in Discover section
"Choose Best Photos" feature
More precise zoom control
Reorganized Photos panel**
New camera and lens support
Bug fixes
Version 4.1 on desktop; 6.1 on mobile
Native Apple M1 support**
New camera and lens support
Bug fixes
*Mobile versions only

**Desktop version only

See also 
 Comparison of raster graphics editors

References

External links 

 
 
 Current versions
 Talk given by Troy Gaul, Adobe's lead Lightroom programmer in 2009 at the C4 conference, covering Lightroom's history, code and architecture up to version 2.0

Lightroom
Photo software
Image organizers
Raster graphics editors
Lua (programming language) software
2007 software
Raw image processing software